Pimblett is a surname. Notable people with the surname include:

Albert Pimblett (1919–2001), English rugby league player
Geoff Pimblett (born 1944), English rugby league player